The 2018–19 season is the Cornish Pirates 16th season in the second tier of the English rugby union league system, the RFU Championship and their first season in the Championship Cup.

Pre–season friendlies

RFU Championship

Table

References

Cornish Pirates seasons
Cornish Pirates
Cornish Pirates